The 2011 Toyota/Save Mart 350 was a NASCAR Sprint Cup Series stock car race held on June 26, 2011, at Infineon Raceway in Sonoma, California. Contested over 110 laps, it was the sixteenth race of the 2011 Sprint Cup Series season and the first of two road course competitions on the schedule. The race was won by Kurt Busch for the Penske Racing team. Jeff Gordon finished second, and Carl Edwards clinched third.

There were five cautions and 13 lead changes among 9 different drivers throughout the course of the race, Kurt Busch's first win of the season. The result moved Kurt Busch to the fourth position in the Drivers' Championship. He remained 34 points behind first place driver Edwards and three ahead of Kyle Busch in seventh. In the Manufacturers' Championship, Chevrolet was leading with 108 points, 15 points ahead Ford and 24 ahead of Toyota. Dodge was fourth on 67 points with 20 races remaining in the season.

Report

Background
Prior to the race, Carl Edwards led the Drivers' Championship with 532 points, and Kevin Harvick stood in second with 512 points. Dale Earnhardt Jr. was third in the Drivers' Championship with 505 points in a Chevrolet, Kyle Busch was fourth with 503 points, and Jimmie Johnson was in fifth also with 503 points. In the Manufacturers' Championship, Chevrolet was leading with 102 points, 13 points ahead of Ford. Toyota, with 81 points, was 23 ahead of Dodge in the battle for third.

Infineon Raceway is one of two road courses to hold NASCAR races, the other being Watkins Glen International. The Chute was only used for NASCAR events such as this race, and was criticized by many drivers, who preferred the full layout.

*Driver changed to Michael McDowell.

Practice and qualifying

Three practice sessions were held before the Sunday race—one on Friday, and two on Saturday. The first session lasted 90 minutes. The Saturday afternoon session lasted 45 minutes, and the evening session lasted 75 minutes. In the first practice session, Kurt Busch was the quickest, leading Denny Hamlin, Kasey Kahne, Kevin Harvick, and Martin Truex Jr., who were in second, third, fourth, and fifth, respectively. During qualifying, forty-four cars were entered, but only forty-three were able to race because of NASCAR's qualifying procedure. Joey Logano clinched his second career pole position, with a time of 1:16.82. He was joined on the front row of the grid by Jamie McMurray. Paul Menard qualified third, Hamlin took fourth, and Ryan Newman started fifth. The driver that failed to qualify was Tony Ave.

In the second practice session, McMurray was the fastest with a fastest lap time of 1:17.62, less than two-tenths of a second quicker than second-placed Kurt Busch. Clint Bowyer took third place, ahead of fourth-placed Kyle Busch and A. J. Allmendinger. The Saturday evening session was held around the same time of day the race would start. Brad Keselowski was the quickest, posting a time of 1:18.10, narrowly faster than both McMurray in second and Kurt Busch in third. Juan Pablo Montoya and Bowyer, rounded out the top five positions.

Results

Qualifying

Race results

Standings after the race

Drivers' Championship standings

Manufacturers' Championship standings

Note: Only the top five positions are included for the driver standings.

References

Toyota Save Mart 350
Toyota Save Mart 350
NASCAR races at Sonoma Raceway
June 2011 sports events in the United States